The Color Purple is an upcoming American musical coming-of-age period drama film directed by Blitz Bazawule and adapted for the screen by Marcus Gardley from the 2005 stage musical of the same name, which is in turn based on Alice Walker's 1982 Pulitzer Prize-winning novel of the same name. It is the second film adaptation of the novel, following Steven Spielberg's 1985 film adaptation. Spielberg and Quincy Jones return to produce this version, along with the stage musical's producers Scott Sanders and Oprah Winfrey, the latter of whom also starred in the 1985 film as Sofia.

The Color Purple is scheduled to be released in the United States on December 20, 2023, by Warner Bros. Pictures.

Premise
A story of the life-long struggles of an African American woman living in the south during the early 1900s.

Cast

Production
On November 2, 2018, it was announced that a film adaptation of the musical was in development at Warner Bros. Pictures and Amblin Entertainment, the same companies that made the 1985 film adaptation of the novel, with Steven Spielberg, Quincy Jones, Scott Sanders, and Oprah Winfrey all signed on to produce. In August 2020, it was announced that Marcus Gardley will pen the screenplay and Black Is King's Blitz Bazawule will direct.

Winfrey praised the selection of Bazawule as director, after she and the producers saw his work on The Burial of Kojo, saying that they "were all blown away by Blitz's unique vision as a director and look forward to seeing how he brings the next evolution of this beloved story to life." It was also announced that Alice Walker, Rebecca Walker, Kristie Macosko Krieger, Carla Gardini, and Mara Jacobs will executive produce the film.

In August 2021, Corey Hawkins was cast in a lead role. That same month, H.E.R. was cast in her feature acting debut. In February 2022, Taraji P. Henson, Fantasia Barrino, Danielle Brooks, Colman Domingo, and Halle Bailey joined the cast, with Barrino and Brooks reprising their roles from productions of the stage musical. In March 2022, Louis Gossett Jr., David Alan Grier, Tamela J. Mann, Phylicia Mpasi, Deon Cole, Stephen Hill, and Ciara joined the cast. In April 2022, Aunjanue Ellis, Elizabeth Marvel and Jon Batiste joined the cast.

Filming began in March 2022, with production taking place at Driftwood Beach on Jekyll Island from March 16 to March 25. Filming officially wrapped in July 2022.

Siedah Garrett will be joining Brenda Russell and Stephen Bray (in place of the late Allee Willis) in contributing new material to the film's score.

Release
The film is scheduled to be released in theaters on December 20, 2023.

References

External links
 

2023 films
2023 drama films
2020s English-language films
2020s historical drama films
2020s musical drama films
2023 LGBT-related films
African-American drama films
African-American LGBT-related films
Amblin Entertainment films
American feminist films
American historical drama films
American LGBT-related films
American musical drama films
Films about child abuse
Films about dysfunctional families
Films about gender
Films about racism in the United States
Films about rape in the United States
Films about remarriage
Films based on adaptations
Films based on American novels
Films based on musicals based on films
Films produced by Quincy Jones
Films produced by Steven Spielberg
Films produced by Oprah Winfrey
Films set in Georgia (U.S. state)
Films set in the 1900s
Films set in the 1910s
Films set in the 1920s
Films set in the 1930s
Films shot in Georgia (U.S. state)
Incest in film
Lesbian-related films
LGBT-related musical drama films
Remakes of American films
Upcoming films
Upcoming English-language films
Warner Bros. films
2020s American films